Polonium (84Po) has 42 isotopes, all of which are radioactive, with between 186 and 227 nucleons. 210Po with a half-life of 138.376 days has the longest half-life of naturally occurring polonium. 209Po, with a half-life of 125.2 years, has the longest half-life of all isotopes of polonium. 209Po and 208Po (half-life 2.9 years) can be made through proton bombardment of bismuth in a cyclotron.

List of isotopes 

|-
| 186Po
|
| style="text-align:right" | 84
| style="text-align:right" | 102
| 186.0044(18)
| 34(12) μs
| α
| 182Pb
| 0+
|
|-
| 187Po
|
| style="text-align:right" | 84
| style="text-align:right" | 103
| 187.00304(30)
| 1.40(0.25) ms
| α
| 183Pb
| (1/2-), (5/2-)
|
|-
| style="text-indent:1em" | 187mPo
|
| colspan="3" style="text-indent:2em" | 4(27) keV
| 0.5 ms
|
|
| 13/2+#
|
|-
| 188Po
|
| style="text-align:right" | 84
| style="text-align:right" | 104
| 187.999422(21)
| 430(180) μs[0.40(+20−15) ms]
| α
| 184Pb
| 0+
|
|-
| 189Po
|
| style="text-align:right" | 84
| style="text-align:right" | 105
| 188.998481(24)
| 5(1) ms
| α
| 185Pb
| 3/2−#
|
|-
| rowspan=2|190Po
| rowspan=2|
| rowspan=2 style="text-align:right" | 84
| rowspan=2 style="text-align:right" | 106
| rowspan=2|189.995101(14)
| rowspan=2|2.46(5) ms
| α (99.9%)
| 186Pb
| rowspan=2|0+
| rowspan=2|
|-
| β+ (.1%)
| 190Bi
|-
| rowspan=2|191Po
| rowspan=2|
| rowspan=2 style="text-align:right" | 84
| rowspan=2 style="text-align:right" | 107
| rowspan=2|190.994574(12)
| rowspan=2|22(1) ms
| α
| 187Pb
| rowspan=2|3/2−#
| rowspan=2|
|-
| β+ (rare)
| 191Bi
|-
| style="text-indent:1em" | 191mPo
|
| colspan="3" style="text-indent:2em" | 130(21) keV
| 93(3) ms
|
|
| (13/2+)
|
|-
| rowspan=2|192Po
| rowspan=2|
| rowspan=2 style="text-align:right" | 84
| rowspan=2 style="text-align:right" | 108
| rowspan=2|191.991335(13)
| rowspan=2|32.2(3) ms
| α (99%)
| 188Pb
| rowspan=2|0+
| rowspan=2|
|-
| β+ (1%)
| 192Bi
|-
| style="text-indent:1em" | 192mPo
|
| colspan="3" style="text-indent:2em" | 2600(500)# keV
| ~1 μs
|
|
| 12+#
|
|-
| rowspan=2|193Po
| rowspan=2|
| rowspan=2 style="text-align:right" | 84
| rowspan=2 style="text-align:right" | 109
| rowspan=2|192.99103(4)
| rowspan=2|420(40) ms[370(+46−40) ms]
| α
| 189Pb
| rowspan=2|3/2−#
| rowspan=2|
|-
| β+ (rare)
| 193Bi
|-
| rowspan=2 style="text-indent:1em" | 193mPo
| rowspan=2|
| rowspan=2 colspan="3" style="text-indent:2em" | 100(30)# keV
| rowspan=2|240(10) ms[243(+11−10) ms]
| α
| 189Pb
| rowspan=2|(13/2+)
| rowspan=2|
|-
| β+ (rare)
| 193Bi
|-
| rowspan=2|194Po
| rowspan=2|
| rowspan=2 style="text-align:right" | 84
| rowspan=2 style="text-align:right" | 110
| rowspan=2|193.988186(13)
| rowspan=2|0.392(4) s
| α
| 190Pb
| rowspan=2|0+
| rowspan=2|
|-
| β+ (rare)
| 194Bi
|-
| style="text-indent:1em" | 194mPo
|
| colspan="3" style="text-indent:2em" | 2525(2) keV
| 15(2) μs
|
|
| (11−)
|
|-
| rowspan=2|195Po
| rowspan=2|
| rowspan=2 style="text-align:right" | 84
| rowspan=2 style="text-align:right" | 111
| rowspan=2|194.98811(4)
| rowspan=2|4.64(9) s
| α (75%)
| 191Pb
| rowspan=2|3/2−#
| rowspan=2|
|-
| β+ (25%)
| 195Bi
|-
| rowspan=3 style="text-indent:1em" | 195mPo
| rowspan=3|
| rowspan=3 colspan="3" style="text-indent:2em" | 110(50) keV
| rowspan=3|1.92(2) s
| α (90%)
| 191Pb
| rowspan=3|13/2+#
| rowspan=3|
|-
| β+ (10%)
| 195Bi
|-
| IT (.01%)
| 195Po
|-
| rowspan=2|196Po
| rowspan=2|
| rowspan=2 style="text-align:right" | 84
| rowspan=2 style="text-align:right" | 112
| rowspan=2|195.985535(14)
| rowspan=2|5.56(12) s
| α (94%)
| 192Pb
| rowspan=2|0+
| rowspan=2|
|-
| β+ (6%)
| 196Bi
|-
| style="text-indent:1em" | 196mPo
|
| colspan="3" style="text-indent:2em" | 2490.5(17) keV
| 850(90) ns
|
|
| (11−)
|
|-
| rowspan=2|197Po
| rowspan=2|
| rowspan=2 style="text-align:right" | 84
| rowspan=2 style="text-align:right" | 113
| rowspan=2|196.98566(5)
| rowspan=2|53.6(10) s
| β+ (54%)
| 197Bi
| rowspan=2|(3/2−)
| rowspan=2|
|-
| α (44%)
| 193Pb
|-
| rowspan=3 style="text-indent:1em" | 197mPo
| rowspan=3|
| rowspan=3 colspan="3" style="text-indent:2em" | 230(80)# keV
| rowspan=3|25.8(1) s
| α (84%)
| 193Pb
| rowspan=3|(13/2+)
| rowspan=3|
|-
| β+ (16%)
| 197Bi
|-
| IT (.01%)
| 197Po
|-
| rowspan=2|198Po
| rowspan=2|
| rowspan=2 style="text-align:right" | 84
| rowspan=2 style="text-align:right" | 114
| rowspan=2|197.983389(19)
| rowspan=2|1.77(3) min
| α (57%)
| 194Pb
| rowspan=2|0+
| rowspan=2|
|-
| β+ (43%)
| 198Bi
|-
| style="text-indent:1em" | 198m1Po
|
| colspan="3" style="text-indent:2em" | 2565.92(20) keV
| 200(20) ns
|
|
| 11−
|
|-
| style="text-indent:1em" | 198m2Po
|
| colspan="3" style="text-indent:2em" | 2691.86(20) keV
| 750(50) ns
|
|
| 12+
|
|-
| rowspan=2|199Po
| rowspan=2|
| rowspan=2 style="text-align:right" | 84
| rowspan=2 style="text-align:right" | 115
| rowspan=2|198.983666(25)
| rowspan=2|5.48(16) min
| β+ (92.5%)
| 199Bi
| rowspan=2|(3/2−)
| rowspan=2|
|-
| α (7.5%)
| 195Pb
|-
| rowspan=3 style="text-indent:1em" | 199mPo
| rowspan=3|
| rowspan=3 colspan="3" style="text-indent:2em" | 312.0(28) keV
| rowspan=3|4.17(4) min
| β+ (73.5%)
| 199Bi
| rowspan=3|13/2+
| rowspan=3|
|-
| α (24%)
| 195Pb
|-
| IT (2.5%)
| 199Po
|-
| rowspan=2|200Po
| rowspan=2|
| rowspan=2 style="text-align:right" | 84
| rowspan=2 style="text-align:right" | 116
| rowspan=2|199.981799(15)
| rowspan=2|11.5(1) min
| β+ (88.8%)
| 200Bi
| rowspan=2|0+
| rowspan=2|
|-
| α (11.1%)
| 196Pb
|-
| rowspan=2|201Po
| rowspan=2|
| rowspan=2 style="text-align:right" | 84
| rowspan=2 style="text-align:right" | 117
| rowspan=2|200.982260(6)
| rowspan=2|15.3(2) min
| β+ (98.4%)
| 201Bi
| rowspan=2|3/2−
| rowspan=2|
|-
| α (1.6%)
| 197Pb
|-
| rowspan=3 style="text-indent:1em" | 201mPo
| rowspan=3|
| rowspan=3 colspan="3" style="text-indent:2em" | 424.1(24) keV
| rowspan=3|8.9(2) min
| IT (56%)
| 201Po
| rowspan=3|13/2+
| rowspan=3|
|-
| EC (41%)
| 201Bi
|-
| α (2.9%)
| 197Pb
|-
| rowspan=2|202Po
| rowspan=2|
| rowspan=2 style="text-align:right" | 84
| rowspan=2 style="text-align:right" | 118
| rowspan=2|201.980758(16)
| rowspan=2|44.7(5) min
| β+ (98%)
| 202Bi
| rowspan=2|0+
| rowspan=2|
|-
| α (2%)
| 198Pb
|-
| style="text-indent:1em" | 202mPo
|
| colspan="3" style="text-indent:2em" | 2626.7(7) keV
| >200 ns
|
|
| 11−
|
|-
| rowspan=2|203Po
| rowspan=2|
| rowspan=2 style="text-align:right" | 84
| rowspan=2 style="text-align:right" | 119
| rowspan=2|202.981420(28)
| rowspan=2|36.7(5) min
| β+ (99.89%)
| 203Bi
| rowspan=2|5/2−
| rowspan=2|
|-
| α (.11%)
| 199Pb
|-
| rowspan=2 style="text-indent:1em" | 203m1Po
| rowspan=2|
| rowspan=2 colspan="3" style="text-indent:2em" | 641.49(17) keV
| rowspan=2|45(2) s
| IT (99.96%)
| 203Po
| rowspan=2|13/2+
| rowspan=2|
|-
| α (.04%)
| 199Pb
|-
| style="text-indent:1em" | 203m2Po
|
| colspan="3" style="text-indent:2em" | 2158.5(6) keV
| >200 ns
|
|
|
|
|-
| rowspan=2|204Po
| rowspan=2|
| rowspan=2 style="text-align:right" | 84
| rowspan=2 style="text-align:right" | 120
| rowspan=2|203.980318(12)
| rowspan=2|3.53(2) h
| β+ (99.33%)
| 204Bi
| rowspan=2|0+
| rowspan=2|
|-
| α (.66%)
| 200Pb
|-
| rowspan=2|205Po
| rowspan=2|
| rowspan=2 style="text-align:right" | 84
| rowspan=2 style="text-align:right" | 121
| rowspan=2|204.981203(21)
| rowspan=2|1.66(2) h
| β+ (99.96%)
| 205Bi
| rowspan=2|5/2−
| rowspan=2|
|-
| α (.04%)
| 201Pb
|-
| style="text-indent:1em" | 205m1Po
|
| colspan="3" style="text-indent:2em" | 143.166(17) keV
| 310(60) ns
|
|
| 1/2−
|
|-
| style="text-indent:1em" | 205m2Po
|
| colspan="3" style="text-indent:2em" | 880.30(4) keV
| 645 μs
|
|
| 13/2+
|
|-
| style="text-indent:1em" | 205m3Po
|
| colspan="3" style="text-indent:2em" | 1461.21(21) keV
| 57.4(9) ms
| IT
| 205Po
| 19/2−
|
|-
| style="text-indent:1em" | 205m4Po
|
| colspan="3" style="text-indent:2em" | 3087.2(4) keV
| 115(10) ns
|
|
| 29/2−
|
|-
| rowspan=2|206Po
| rowspan=2|
| rowspan=2 style="text-align:right" | 84
| rowspan=2 style="text-align:right" | 122
| rowspan=2|205.980481(9)
| rowspan=2|8.8(1) d
| β+ (94.55%)
| 206Bi
| rowspan=2|0+
| rowspan=2|
|-
| α (5.45%)
| 202Pb
|-
| style="text-indent:1em" | 206m1Po
|
| colspan="3" style="text-indent:2em" | 1585.85(11) keV
| 222(10) ns
|
|
| (8+)#
|
|-
| style="text-indent:1em" | 206m2Po
|
| colspan="3" style="text-indent:2em" | 2262.22(14) keV
| 1.05(6) μs
|
|
| (9−)#
|
|-
| rowspan=2|207Po
| rowspan=2|
| rowspan=2 style="text-align:right" | 84
| rowspan=2 style="text-align:right" | 123
| rowspan=2|206.981593(7)
| rowspan=2|5.80(2) h
| β+ (99.97%)
| 207Bi
| rowspan=2|5/2−
| rowspan=2|
|-
| α (.021%)
| 203Pb
|-
| style="text-indent:1em" | 207m1Po
|
| colspan="3" style="text-indent:2em" | 68.573(14) keV
| 205(10) ns
|
|
| 1/2−
|
|-
| style="text-indent:1em" | 207m2Po
|
| colspan="3" style="text-indent:2em" | 1115.073(16) keV
| 49(4) μs
|
|
| 13/2+
|
|-
| style="text-indent:1em" | 207m3Po
|
| colspan="3" style="text-indent:2em" | 1383.15(6) keV
| 2.79(8) s
| IT
| 207Po
| 19/2−
|
|-
| rowspan=2|208Po
| rowspan=2|
| rowspan=2 style="text-align:right" | 84
| rowspan=2 style="text-align:right" | 124
| rowspan=2|207.9812457(19)
| rowspan=2|2.898(2) y
| α (99.99%)
| 204Pb
| rowspan=2|0+
| rowspan=2|
|-
| β+ (.00277%)
| 208Bi
|-
| rowspan=2|209Po
| rowspan=2|
| rowspan=2 style="text-align:right" | 84
| rowspan=2 style="text-align:right" | 125
| rowspan=2|208.9824304(20)
| rowspan=2|125.2(3.3) y
| α (99.546%)
| 205Pb
| rowspan=2|1/2−
| rowspan=2|
|-
| ε (.454%)
| 209Bi
|-
| 210Po
| Radium F
| style="text-align:right" | 84
| style="text-align:right" | 126
| 209.9828737(13)
| 138.376(2) d
| α
| 206Pb
| 0+
| Trace
|-
| style="text-indent:1em" | 210mPo
|
| colspan="3" style="text-indent:2em" | 5057.61(4) keV
| 263(5) ns
|
|
| 16+
|
|-
| 211Po
| Actinium C'
| style="text-align:right" | 84
| style="text-align:right" | 127
| 210.9866532(14)
| 0.516(3) s
| α
| 207Pb
| 9/2+
| Trace
|-
| rowspan=2 style="text-indent:1em" | 211m1Po
| rowspan=2|
| rowspan=2 colspan="3" style="text-indent:2em" | 1462(5) keV
| rowspan=2|25.2(6) s
| α (99.98%)
| 207Pb
| rowspan=2|(25/2+)
| rowspan=2|
|-
| IT (.016%)
| 211Po
|-
| style="text-indent:1em" | 211m2Po
|
| colspan="3" style="text-indent:2em" | 2135.7(9) keV
| 243(21) ns
|
|
| (31/2−)
|
|-
| style="text-indent:1em" | 211m3Po
|
| colspan="3" style="text-indent:2em" | 4873.3(17) keV
| 2.8(7) μs
|
|
| (43/2+)
|
|-
| 212Po
| Thorium C'
| style="text-align:right" | 84
| style="text-align:right" | 128
| 211.9888680(13)
| 299(2) ns
| α
| 208Pb
| 0+
| Trace
|-
| rowspan=2 style="text-indent:1em" | 212mPo
| rowspan=2|
| rowspan=2 colspan="3" style="text-indent:2em" | 2911(12) keV
| rowspan=2|45.1(6) s
| α (99.93%)
| 208Pb
| rowspan=2|(18+)
| rowspan=2|
|-
| IT (.07%)
| 212Po
|-
| 213Po
|
| style="text-align:right" | 84
| style="text-align:right" | 129
| 212.992857(3)
| 3.65(4) μs
| α
| 209Pb
| 9/2+
| Trace
|-
| 214Po
| Radium C'
| style="text-align:right" | 84
| style="text-align:right" | 130
| 213.9952014(16)
| 164.3(20) μs
| α
| 210Pb
| 0+
| Trace
|-
| rowspan=2|215Po
| rowspan=2|Actinium A
| rowspan=2 style="text-align:right" | 84
| rowspan=2 style="text-align:right" | 131
| rowspan=2|214.9994200(27)
| rowspan=2|1.781(4) ms
| α (99.99%)
| 211Pb
| rowspan=2|9/2+
| rowspan=2|Trace
|-
| β− (2.3×10−4%)
| 215At
|-
| rowspan=2|216Po
| rowspan=2|Thorium A
| rowspan=2 style="text-align:right" | 84
| rowspan=2 style="text-align:right" | 132
| rowspan=2|216.0019150(24)
| rowspan=2|0.145(2) s
| α
| 212Pb
| rowspan=2|0+
| rowspan=2|Trace
|-
| β−β− (rare)
| 216Rn
|-
| rowspan=2|217Po
| rowspan=2|
| rowspan=2 style="text-align:right" | 84
| rowspan=2 style="text-align:right" | 133
| rowspan=2|217.006335(7)
| rowspan=2|1.47(5) s
| α (95%)
| 213Pb
| rowspan=2|5/2+#
| rowspan=2|
|-
| β− (5%)
| 217At
|-
| rowspan=2|218Po
| rowspan=2|Radium A
| rowspan=2 style="text-align:right" | 84
| rowspan=2 style="text-align:right" | 134
| rowspan=2|218.0089730(26)
| rowspan=2|3.10(1) min
| α (99.98%)
| 214Pb
| rowspan=2|0+
| rowspan=2|Trace
|-
| β− (.02%)
| 218At
|-
| rowspan=2|219Po
| rowspan=2|
| rowspan=2 style="text-align:right" | 84
| rowspan=2 style="text-align:right" | 135
| rowspan=2|219.01361(16)
| rowspan=2|10.3(1) min
| α (28.2%)
| 215Pb
| rowspan=2|9/2+#
| rowspan=2|
|-
| β− (71.8%)
| 219At
|-
| 220Po
|
| style="text-align:right" | 84
| style="text-align:right" | 136
| 220.0164(18)
| 40# s[>300 ns]
| β−
| 220At
| 0+
|
|-
| 221Po
|
| style="text-align:right" | 84
| style="text-align:right" | 137
| 221.02123(20)
| 2.2(0.7) min
| β−
| 221At
| 9/2+#
|
|-
| 222Po
|
| style="text-align:right" | 84
| style="text-align:right" | 138
| 222.024144(40)
| 9.1(7.2) min
| β−
| 222At
| 0+
|

See also
 Poisoning of Alexander Litvinenko (with 210Po)

References 

Generenal references
Isotope data is sourced in:
 Atomic weights of the elements:

 Isotopic mass, spin and parity

 Half-life

 
Polonium
Polonium